Rock!!!!! is an album released by Violent Femmes in 1995. It was originally released only in Australia, but is now available in the rest of the world. It features cover photography by David LaChapelle. This was the first Violent Femmes album not to chart on the Billboard 200 since 1984's Hallowed Ground.

Track listing

Personnel
 Gordon Gano – vocals, guitar, violin
 Brian Ritchie – bass, vocals, guitar, organ, didgeridoo, autoharp
 Guy Hoffman – drums, vocals
 David Vartanian – electric piano
 Bob Jennings – tenor and baritone sax, horn arrangement
 Pat Basler – alto sax
 Ed Spangenberg – trombone
 Sigmund Snopek III – mellotron
 Producers – Brian Ritchie, Gordon Gano
 Recording and mixing – David Vartanian

Charts

References

1995 albums
Violent Femmes albums
Mushroom Records albums